Diego Daniel Rodrigues de Matos (born 8 January 1997), known as Diego Matos, is a Brazilian footballer who plays as a left back for Náutico.

Club career
Born in Belém, Pará, Diego Matos joined Paysandu's youth setup in 2010, aged 13. He made his first team debut on 24 July 2018, coming on as a second-half substitute for Mateus Müller in a 1–0 Série B home win over Guarani.

Diego Matos became a regular starter for the club afterwards, and agreed to a pre-contract with Avaí on 13 July 2021. He was presented at his new club the following 12 January, after agreeing to a 18-month deal.

Career statistics

Honours
Paysandu
Campeonato Paraense: 2020, 2021

References

External links

1997 births
Living people
Sportspeople from Belém
Brazilian footballers
Association football defenders
Campeonato Brasileiro Série B players
Campeonato Brasileiro Série C players
Paysandu Sport Club players
Avaí FC players